Hallopodidae is a family of Late Jurassic crocodylomorphs. They have been recovered as the closest relatives of the Crocodyliformes.

References

Prehistoric reptile families
Late Jurassic crocodylomorphs
Fossil taxa described in 1881